Diez MDP (call sign LU 82 TV) is a television station broadcasting from Mar del Plata, Buenos Aires, Argentina carrying programs from El Trece. Founded in 1966, the station currently produces its own newscast, plus some local entertainment and public affairs programming shown on weekends.

Local programming
Telediario - noon newscast
Telediario Última Edición - midnight newscast
Agenda Agraria - country news
Sentidos: Vino, Gastronomía y Buen Vivir - cooking
Casa Express - DIY
Octano - motoring

External links
Official website

Television stations in Argentina
Television channels and stations established in 1963